The 2011 Nigerian Senate election in Kwara State was held on April 9, 2011, to elect members of the Nigerian Senate to represent Kwara State. Mohammed Shaaba Lafiagi representing Kwara North, Bukola Saraki representing Kwara Central and Simon Ajibola representing Kwara South all won on the platform of Peoples Democratic Party.

Overview

Summary

Results

Kwara North 
Peoples Democratic Party candidate Mohammed Shaaba Lafiagi won the election, defeating other party candidates.

Kwara Central 
Peoples Democratic Party candidate Bukola Saraki won the election, defeating other party candidates.

Kwara South 
Peoples Democratic Party candidate Simon Ajibola won the election, defeating party candidates.

References 

Kwara State Senate elections
Kwara State senatorial elections
Kwara State senatorial elections